Januszowice may refer to the following places:
Januszowice, Gmina Słomniki in Lesser Poland Voivodeship (south Poland)
Januszowice, Gmina Zielonki in Lesser Poland Voivodeship (south Poland)
Januszowice, Busko County in Świętokrzyskie Voivodeship (south-central Poland)
Januszowice, Pińczów County in Świętokrzyskie Voivodeship (south-central Poland)